Gamal Khashaba  served as the President of the National Committee for Air Scouts of the Egyptian Federation for Scouts and Girl Guides as well as the General Secretary of the Arab Scout Bureau.

In 1982, he was awarded the 156th Bronze Wolf, the only distinction of the World Organization of the Scout Movement, awarded by the World Scout Committee for exceptional services to world Scouting.

References

External links

Recipients of the Bronze Wolf Award
Year of birth missing
Scouting and Guiding in Egypt